Robert Lynn (9 July 1918 – 15 January 1982) was a British film and TV director. His TV work includes Interpol Calling, Armchair Theatre and Captain Scarlet.

He also produced the classic children's film The Railway Children (1970).

He was the son of actor Ralph Lynn.

Selected filmography
 Information Received (1961)
 Two Letter Alibi (1962)
 Postman's Knock (1962)
 Victim Five (1964)
 Coast of Skeletons (1964)
 Mozambique (1965)
 Change Partners (1965)
 Sandy the Seal (1965, released 1969)
 Eve (1968)

References

External links
 
 

1918 births
1982 deaths
British film directors
People from Fulham